Mamre, full Hebrew name Elonei Mamre ("Oaks/Terebinths of Mamre"), refers to an ancient religious site originally focused on a single holy tree, growing "since time immemorial" at Hebron in Canaan. It is known from the biblical story of Abraham and the three visitors . The tree under which he had pitched his tent is known as the oak or terebinth of Mamre. Modern scholars have identified three sites near Hebron which, in different historical periods, have been successively known as Mamre: Khirbet Nimra (a little excavated Persian and Hellenistic period site), Ramat el-Khalil (the best known site), and Khirbet es-Sibte. The last one contained an old oak tree identified by a relatively new tradition as the Oak of Mamre, which has collapsed in 2019, and is on the grounds of a Russian Orthodox monastery.

Jewish-Roman historian Josephus, as well as Christian and Jewish sources from the Byzantine period, locate Mamre at the site later renamed in Arabic as Ramat el-Khalil, 4 km north of historical Hebron and approximately halfway between that city and Halhul. Herod the Great apparently initiated the Jewish identification of the site with Mamre, by erecting there a monumental enclosure. It was one of the three most important "fairs" or market places in Judea, where the fair was held next to the venerated tree, accompanied by an interdenominational festival joined in time by Jews, pagans, and Christians. This prompted Emperor Constantine the Great to unsuccessfully attempt at putting a stop to this practice by erecting a Christian basilica there.

Hebrew Bible

Names and events
Mamre is the site where Abraham pitched the tents for his camp, built an altar, and was brought divine tidings, in the guise of three angels, of Sarah's pregnancy.

Genesis 13:18 has Abraham settling by 'the great trees of Mamre'. The original Hebrew tradition appears, to judge from a textual variation conserved in the Septuagint, to have referred to a single great oak tree, which Josephus called Ogyges. Mamre may have been an Amorite, a tribal chieftain after whom a grove of trees was named. Genesis connected it with Hebron or a place nearby that city. Mamre has frequently been associated with the Cave of the Patriarchs. According to one scholar, there is considerable confusion in the Biblical narrative concerning not only Mamre, but also Machpelah, Hebron and Kiryat Arba, all four of which are aligned repeatedly. In Genesis, Mamre is also identified with Hebron itself. The Christian tradition of identifying a ruined site surrounded by walls and called in Arabic Rāmet el-Ḥalīl ('Hill of the Friend', meaning: "the friend of God", i.e. Abraham), with the Old Testament Mamre, goes back to the earliest Christian pilgrims in the 4th century CE, and connects to a tradition from the time of Herod (1st century BCE).

Elsewhere it is called 'the Terebinths of Mamre the Amorite', Mamre being the name of one of the three Amorite chiefs who joined forces with those of Abraham in pursuit of Chedorlaomer to save Lot (Gen. 14:13,24).

The supposed discrepancy is often explained as reflecting the discordance between the different scribal traditions behind the composition of the Pentateuch, the former relating to the Yahwist, the latter to the Elohist recension, according to the documentary hypothesis of modern scholarship.

Identification
There appear to be three main sites which have been known, at different times in history, as Mamre. These are, chronologically:
Khirbet Nimra, an archaeological site next to Hebron and 2,5 km north of Ramat el-Khalil, identified as the Persian- and Hellenistic-period Mamre.
Ramat el-Khalil, also spelled Ramet el-Khulil, is the site identified as Mamre in the time of King Herod (1st century BCE), Constantine the Great (4th century CE), and possibly the Crusader Kingdom of Jerusalem (12th-13th centuries CE). Talmudic sources refer to the site as Beth Ilanim or Botnah. The ruins of the Herodian and Constantinian structure became also known in Arabic as Beit el-Khalil, meaning "Abraham's House".
Khirbet es-Sibte (also Ain Sebta), the present-day site of the so-called Oak of Mamre, 2 km southwest of Ramat el-Khalil, has been considered since the 19th century by Christians to be the place where Abraham saw the angels. A modern Russian Orthodox monastery is marking the site.

History and archaeology

Khirbet Nimra: Persian and Hellenistic Mamre
According to Jericke among others, Persian and Hellenistic Mamre was located at Khirbet Nimra, 1 km north of modern Hebron, where a pagan tree cult predated the composition of the biblical Abraham narrative.

Ramat el-Khalil

Research and analysis
Greenberg & Keinan, summarising previous dig reports, list the outstanding components of the site as being a large Roman-era enclosure, a Byzantine church, and a Crusader church. However, Denys Pringle's analysis of both historical and archaeological sources leads to the firm conclusion that the Crusader-era Church of the Trinity, mentioned by medieval pilgrims, stood at the foot of a hill, not at its top, and certainly not at Ramat el-Khalil, where the remains of the Constantinian church were found undisturbed by any later building in 1926. Greenberg & Keinan are listing the main periods of settlement as: Early Roman, Late Roman, Byzantine, and Crusader, with less substantial findings from the Iron Age IIc and the Hellenistic period. However, Yitzhak Magen, the last to excavate the site, claims that findings previously attributed to the biblical time of the Kings during the Iron Age, and the Hellenistic Hasmoneans, are in fact of far newer date, Byzantine or later.

Bronze Age
Early Bronze Age pottery sherds found at the Ramat el-Khalil site may indicate that a cultic shrine of some kind was in use from 2600-2000 BCE, but there is no archaeological evidence for the site being occupied from the first half of the second millennium down to the end of the Iron Age – that is, very broadly speaking, between 2000 and 600 BCE.

Herod: the enclosure
Herod the Great transferred the Mamre tradition 2,5 km to the north, from the site at Khirbet Nimra (see above) to the site at Ramet el-Khalil. This was part of Herod's upgrade of Hebron as a cult centre dedicated to the patriarch Abraham, by erecting two shrines: one at his tomb, and one at a site he connected to Abraham's place of residence, where the patriarch dined under a tree together with the three men. It has been noted that Hebron and Mamre were located in Idumaean territory, that both Jews and Idumaeans regarded Abraham as their common ancestor, and that Herod came from an Idumaean family that had only recently converted to Judaism.

The 2 m thick stone wall enclosing an area 49 m wide and 65 m long was constructed by Herod, possibly as a cultic place of worship. It contained an ancient well, more than 5 m in diameter, referred to as Abraham's Well.

Josephus: the terebinth
Josephus' terebinth tree is distinct from the modern Oak of Mamre and stood at a different location
Josephus (37–c. 100) records a tradition according to which the terebinth at Mamre was as old as the world itself (War 4.534). The site was soaked in legend. Jews, Christians and Pagans made sacrifices on the site, burning animals, and the tree was considered immune to the flames of the sacrifices. Constantine the Great (r. 302–337) was still attempting, without success, to stop this tradition.

Late Roman period: Hadrian's temple
The Herodian structure was destroyed by Simon bar Kokhba's army, only to be rebuilt by the Roman emperor Hadrian. Hadrian revived the fair, which had long been an important one as it took place at an intersection forming the transport and communications nub of the southern Judean mountains. This mercatus (Heb. yerid or shuq) or "fair, market" was one of the sites, according to a Jewish tradition conserved in Jerome, chosen by Hadrian to sell remnants of Bar Kochba's defeated army into slavery.

Rabbinical tradition
Due to the idolatrous nature of the rituals at the fair, Jews were forbidden to participate by their rabbis. According to the Jerusalem Talmud:
They prohibited a fair only in the case of one of the character of that at Botnah. As it has been taught along these same lines in a Tannaitic tradition. "There are three fairs, the fair at Gaza, the fair at Acre, and the fair at Botnah, and the most debased of the lot of them is the fair of Botnah."Neusner (1982)

Late Roman festival and Byzantine basilica
Eusebius and Sozomen describe how, notwithstanding the rabbinic ban, by the time of Constantine the Great's reign (302–337), the market had become an informal interdenominational festival, in addition to its functions as a trade fair, frequented by Christians, Jews and pagans. The cultic shrine was made over for Christian use after Eutropia, Constantine's mother-in-law, visited it and was scandalised by its pagan character. Constantine, informed of these pagan practices, attempted without success to put an end to the festive rituals celebrated around the tree. He angrily wrote to Macarius, bishop of Jerusalem and all the other bishops of Palestine and admonished them, letting them know that he had ordered the comes Acacius to destroy all pagan idols and punish those holding on to pagan practices. The enclosure was then consecrated, Constantine had a basilica built, dedicated to Saint George and the enclosure of the Terebinth of Mamre roofed over, the foundations of which are still visible.

The 1957 plan and reconstruction of the site made after the excavation performed by German scholar A. E. Mader in 1926-1928, shows the Constantinian basilica along the eastern wall of the Haram Ramet el-Khalil enclosure, with a well, altar, and tree in the unroofed western part of the enclosure.

The venerated tree was destroyed by Christian visitors taking souvenirs, leaving only a stump which survived down to the seventh century.

The fifth-century account by Sozomen (Historia Ecclesiastica Book II 4-54) is the most detailed account of the practices at Mamre during the early Christian period.

A vignette of the Constantinian basilica with its colonnaded atrium appears on the 6th-century Madaba Map, under the partially preserved Greek caption "Arbo, also the Terebinth. The Oak of Mambre".

Antoninus of Piacenza in his Itinerarium, an account of his journey to the Holy Land (ca.570 CE) comments on the basilica, with its four porticoes, and an unroofed atrium. Both Christians and Jews worshipped there, separated by a small screen (cancellus). The Jewish worshippers would flock there to celebrate the deposition of Jacob and David on the day after the traditional date of Christ's birthday.

The Constantinian basilica was destroyed during the Persian invasion of 614.

Early Muslim period
Arculf, a Frankish bishop who toured the Levant in around 670-680, witnessed the monastery still being active around 670, a few decades after Umar's conquest. He reported, indicating a slightly erroneous location in relation to the Tombs of the Patriarchs:	
A mile to the north of the Tombs that have been described above, is the very grassy and flowery hill of Mambre, looking towards Hebron, which lies to the south of it. This little mountain, which is called Mambre, has a level summit, at the north side of which a great stone church has been built, in the right side of which between the two walls of this great Basilica, the Oak of Mambre, wonderful to relate, stands rooted in the earth; it is also called the oak of Abraham, because under it he once hospitably received the Angels. St. Hieronymus elsewhere relates, that this tree had existed from the beginning of the world to the reign of the Emperor Constantine; but he did not say that it had utterly perished, perhaps because at that time, although the whole of that vast tree was not to be seen as it had been formerly, yet a spurious trunk still remained rooted in the ground, protected under the roof of the church, of the height of two men; from this wasted spurious trunk, which has been cut on all sides by axes, small chips are carried to the different provinces of the world, on account of the veneration and memory of that oak, under which, as has been mentioned above, that famous and notable visit of the Angels was granted to the patriarch Abraham.

Crusader period
Yitzhak Magen was in 1993 of the opinion that during the Crusades, the site may have been used by a Church of the Trinity. Denys Pringle firmly refutes this possibility, based on the analysis of pilgrims' reports.

Avraham Negev considers the last clear identification and description of the Byzantine church remains at Ramat el-Khalil to come from the Russian pilgrim known as Abbot Daniel, who visited the site in 1106/8, and he qualifies other medieval reports from the 12th century onwards as not clear with regard to the location of the site they describe.

After 1150s: different Jewish and Christian locations
After the middle of the 12th century the reports become vague and the location of "Abraham's Oak" seems to have migrated to one or more locations situated on the road connecting Ramat el-Khalil with Hebron. What is nowadays considered the traditional location of the Oak of Abraham is a site originally known in Arabic as Ain Sebta, which used to be outside historical Hebron but is now within the urban sprawl of the Palestinian city.

As written in a footnote from an 1895 publication of Arculf's pilgrimage report,
The Oak or Terebinth of Abraham has been shown in two different sites. Arculf and many others (Jerome, Itin[erarium] Hierosol[ymitanum], Sozomen, Eucherius [possibly Eucherius of Lyon], Benjamin of Tudela, the Abbot Daniel,.... etc.) seem to point to the ruin of er Râmeh, near which is Beit el Khulil, or Abraham's House, with a fine spring well. This is still held by the Jews to be the Oak of Mamre. The Christians point to another site, Ballûtet Sebta, where [there] is a fine specimen of Sindian (Quercus Pseudococcifera)." Ballut is the Arabic word for oak.

Ramat el-Khalil today
The Palestinian authorities have made the site accessible to visitors under the name Haram Ramat Al Khalil.

Since, in Islam, the Kaaba in Mecca is sacred as the "house of Ibrahim/Abraham" (see Qur'an 2:125), his tradition of hospitality has also moved to that city, and under Muslim rule Mamre has lost its historical significance as an inter-religious place of worship and festivity. The site was excavated by 20th-century Christian and Jewish archaeologists, and a 2015 initiative by the Palestinian Ministry of Tourism, joined by the UN and youth belonging to all three communities in the area — Muslim, Jewish, and Christian — restored the site for visitors and built a new "meeting centre". However, as of 2019, the centre had not yet been opened and the site itself doesn't see much traffic.

Footnotes

Bibliography

Adler, William (2013). The Kingdom of Edessa and the Creation of a Christian Aristocracy. In Natalie B. Dohrmann, Annette Yoshiko Reed (eds.) Jews, Christians, and the Roman Empire: The Poetics of Power in Late Antiquity, University of Pennsylvania Press, pp. 43–62 p. 57.
Adamnanus, De Locis Sanctis - see Macpherson translation

Eusebius. Life of Constantine. Averil Cameron and Stuart George Hall (tr., ed.), Oxford University Press (1999) 

Frazer, James George (2003). Folklore in the Old Testament Studies in Comparative Religion Legend and Law: Studies in Comparative Religion, Legend, and Law Kessinger Publishing'. 

Haran, Menahem (1985). Temples and Temple-Service in Ancient Israel. Eisenbrauns, p. 53.
Horne, Thomas Hartwell (1856). An Introduction to the Critical Study and Knowledge of the Holy Scriptures''''. Longman, Brown, Green, Longmans & Roberts

Horne, Thomas Hartwell (1856). An Introduction to the Critical Study and Knowledge of the Holy Scriptures. Longman, Brown, Green, Longmans & Roberts, p. 63.
Jacobs, Andrew S. Remains of the Jews: The Holy Land and Christian Empire in Late Antiquity. Stanford University Press, 2004.

Letellier, Robert Ignatius (1995). Day in Mamre, Night in Sodom: Abraham and Lot in Genesis 18 and 19'. BRILL, 
Louth, Andrew & Oden, Thomas C. & Conti, Marco. Ancient Christian Commentary on Scripture: Old Testament. InterVarsity Press , pp60–66

Mader, Andreas Evaristus (1954). Mambre. Die Ergebnisse der Ausgrabungen im heiligen Bezirk Râmet el-Ḫalîl in Südpalästina 1926–1928. 2 volumes, Erich Wewel Verlag, Freiburg im Breisgau, in German.
Magen, Itzhaq (1993). The New Encyclopedia of Archaeological Excavations in the Holy Land, Jerusalem, via www.quondam.com, re-accessed 19 Oct 2021.

Netzer, Ehud and Laureys-Chachy, Rachel (2006). The Architecture of Herod, the Great Builder. Mohr Siebeck, p. 231

Niesiolowski-Spano, Lukasz (2016). The Origin Myths and Holy Places in the Old Testament: A Study of Aetiological Narratives, Routledge, p. 132.
Pagolu, Augustine (1998). The Religion of the Patriarchs, A&C Black, pp. 59-60.

Rosenfield, Ben-Zion; Joseph Menirav, Chava Cassel. Markets and Marketing in Roman Palestine. Brill, 2005 

Stanley, Arthur Penrhyn (1856). Sinai and Palestine, in Connection with Their History. J. Murray, London
Stavrakopoulou, Francesca (2011). Land of Our Fathers: The Roles of Ancestor Veneration in Biblical Land Claims. Bloomsbury Publishing USA, pp. 51-52: "Throughout Genesis, all these toponyms crowd the ancestral burial site, jostling for recognition. Though it is often assumed these were all essentially the same place, the aligning, glossing or renaming of locations is frequently suggestive of changing or competing claims to ownership."

Mills, Watson E. & Bullard, Roger Aubrey (1998). Mercer Dictionary of the Bible''. Mercer University Press,

See also
Oak of Mamre, an ancient tree, situated ca. halfway between historical Mamre and Hebron, distinct from Josephus' "terebinth tree of Mamre" and the Constantinian site
Abraham's Oak Holy Trinity Monastery, a Russian Orthodox monastery located at what a more recent tradition identifies as the "Oak of Mamre"
The Mamre Institute, an Israeli research institute aimed at providing accurate access to Jewish religious texts, including the Hebrew Bible, presented in both Hebrew and English.

External links
Photos of the Mamre site at the Manar al-Athar photo archive

4th-century establishments in the Roman Empire
Archaeological sites in the West Bank
Conversion of non-Christian religious buildings and structures into churches
Hebron
Torah places